Route 16, or Highway 16, can refer to:

International
 Asian Highway 16
 European route E16 
 European route E016

Australia 
 - Thompsons Road (Victoria)   

 - South Australia

Canada
Parts of the Trans-Canada Highway
Yellowhead Highway, part of the Trans-Canada Highway system
 Alberta Highway 16
 Alberta Highway 16A
 Alberta Highway 16X (former)
 British Columbia Highway 16
 Manitoba Highway 16
  Manitoba Highway 16A
 Saskatchewan Highway 16
 Saskatchewan Highway 16A
 Saskatchewan Highway 16B
 New Brunswick Route 16

Other instances of Highway 16
 Nova Scotia Trunk 16
 Ontario Highway 16
 Prince Edward Island Route 16

China 
  G16 Expressway

Czech Republic
 I/16 Highway; Czech: Silnice I/16

India 
  National Highway 16 (India)

Israel
 Highway 16 (Israel)

Iran 
Road 16

Ireland
  N16 road (Ireland)

Italy
 Autostrada A16
 RA 16

Japan
 Japan National Route 16
 Route 16 (Nagoya Expressway)
 Ōsakakō Route

Korea, South
 Ulsan Expressway

New Zealand
 New Zealand State Highway 16

Paraguay
 National Route 16

United Kingdom
 British A16 (Peterborough-Grimsby)

United States
 Interstate 16
 U.S. Route 16
 New England Route 16 (former)
 Alabama State Route 16 (former)
 Arkansas Highway 16
 California State Route 16
 County Route A16 (California)
 County Route E16 (California)
 County Route G16 (California)
 County Route J16 (California)
 County Route S16 (California)
 Colorado State Highway 16
 Connecticut Route 16
 Delaware Route 16
 Florida State Road 16
 Georgia State Route 16
 Hawaii Route 16 (former)
 Idaho State Highway 16
 Illinois Route 16
 Indiana State Road 16
 Iowa Highway 16
 K-16 (Kansas highway)
 Kentucky Route 16
 Louisiana Highway 16
 Louisiana State Route 16 (former)
 Maine State Route 16
 Maryland Route 16
 Massachusetts Route 16
 M-16 (Michigan highway) (former)
 Minnesota State Highway 16
 County Road 16 (St. Louis County, Minnesota)
 Mississippi Highway 16
 Missouri Route 16
 Montana Highway 16
 Nebraska Highway 16
 Nebraska Spur 16B
 Nebraska Spur 16F
 Nebraska Recreation Road 16C
 Nebraska Recreation Road 16D
 Nevada State Route 16 (former)
 New Hampshire Route 16
 New Hampshire Route 16B
 New Mexico State Road 16
 County Route 16 (Monmouth County, New Jersey)
 New York State Route 16
 County Route 16 (Allegany County, New York)
 County Route 16 (Cattaraugus County, New York)
 County Route 16 (Cayuga County, New York)
 County Route 16 (Chautauqua County, New York)
 County Route 16 (Chenango County, New York)
 County Route 16 (Clinton County, New York)
 County Route 16 (Dutchess County, New York)
 County Route 16 (Franklin County, New York)
 County Route 16 (Herkimer County, New York)
 County Route 16 (Lewis County, New York)
 County Route 16 (Monroe County, New York)
 County Route 16 (Oneida County, New York)
 County Route 16 (Orange County, New York)
 County Route 16 (Otsego County, New York)
 County Route 16 (Putnam County, New York)
 County Route 16 (Rensselaer County, New York)
 County Route 16 (Schenectady County, New York)
 County Route 16 (Schuyler County, New York)
 County Route 16 (Steuben County, New York)
 County Route 16 (Suffolk County, New York)
 County Route 16 (Ulster County, New York)
 County Route 16 (Warren County, New York)
 North Carolina Highway 16
 North Dakota Highway 16
 Ohio State Route 16
 Oklahoma State Highway 16
 Pennsylvania Route 16
 South Carolina Highway 16
 South Dakota Highway 16 (former)
 South Dakota Highway 16B (former)
 Tennessee State Route 16
 Texas State Highway 16
 Texas State Highway Loop 16 (former)
 Texas State Highway Spur 16
 Farm to Market Road 16
 Texas Park Road 16
 Utah State Route 16
 Vermont Route 16
 Virginia State Route 16
 State Route 16 (Virginia 1918-1940) (former)
 Washington State Route 16
 Primary State Highway 16 (Washington) (former)
 West Virginia Route 16
 Wisconsin Highway 16

Territories
 Guam Highway 16
 Puerto Rico Highway 16

See also
List of A16 roads
List of highways numbered 16A
Route-16
The Highway, a Sirius XM channel previously known as Highway 16.